Natalie Price may refer to:

 Natalie Evans, a fictional character from the BBC soap opera EastEnders
 Natalie Price (politician), a member of the Michigan House of Representatives